Quentin V. Anderson (May 7, 1932 – December 27, 2019) was an American politician in the state of Iowa.

Anderson was born in Ringgold County, Iowa. He attended the American Institute of Business and is a farmer. He served in the Iowa State Senate from 1969 to 1973, and House of Representatives from 1963 to 1967 and 1973 to 1975, as a Republican. He died on December 27, 2019.

References

|-

|-

|-

1932 births
2019 deaths
People from Ringgold County, Iowa
Farmers from Iowa
Republican Party Iowa state senators
Republican Party members of the Iowa House of Representatives
American members of the Community of Christ